Schiener may refer to the following articles:

People with last name Schiener
Gretel Schiener (born 1940), a German artistic gymnast

Others
Schiener Berg, a mountain in Baden-Württemberg, Germany